Thomas Pleasants (1729-1818) was a notable merchant, property developer and philanthropist in Dublin, Ireland, after whom Pleasants Street in Dublin is named.

Life
Pleasants was born in County Carlow in 1729, son of William Pleasants and his wife Grace Edwards. His grandfather was Thomas Pleasants, alderman of Dublin.

His grandfather had leased a large piece of land near Capel St. from Dublin Corporation, which Pleasants inherited some time after his grandfather's death in 1729. His initial income derived from this property, though he also had dealings with his cousins the Pasleys, who were wine merchants at 9 Abbey St.

He married in 1787 Mildred Daunt, second daughter of George Daunt, surgeon in Mercer's Hospital.  

He and his wife (died 1814) were buried in the churchyard of St. Bride's Church.

Donations
Among his donations were over £12,000 in 1814 for the erection of a large stove-house near Cork St. for poor weavers in the Liberties, £8,000 for the building of the Meath Hospital, and his own house (67 Camden St.) for the provision of a girls' school and orphanage, along with £1,200 per annum to run it and extra money provided for dowries for the girls (only applied to Protestants, though), to do this Pleasant's Asylum for Female Orphans on Camden st. was founded in 1818 it closed in 1949. He donated his large library and a large sum of money to the Royal Dublin Society.

References

1729 births
1818 deaths
18th-century Irish businesspeople
19th-century Irish businesspeople
People from County Carlow
People from County Dublin
19th-century Irish philanthropists